Chintaparru is a village in Palacole mandal, located in West Godavari district of the Indian state of Andhra Pradesh. Chintaparru has its own railway station connecting major cities.

Demographics 

 Census of India, Chintaparru had a population of 3440. The total population constitute, 1775 males and 1665 females with a sex ratio of 938 females per 1000 males. 339 children are in the age group of 0–6 years, with sex ratio of 836. The average literacy rate stands at 72.98%.

References 

Villages in West Godavari district